Adelphia is a genus in the Malpighiaceae, a family of about 75 genera of flowering plants in the order Malpighiales. Adelphia comprises four species of woody vines native to the West Indies, Mesoamerica, and western South America.

External links and references

Malpighiaceae Malpighiaceae - description, taxonomy, phylogeny, and nomenclature
Adelphia
Anderson, W. R. 2006. Eight segregates from the neotropical genus Mascagnia (Malpighiaceae). Novon 16: 168–204.

Malpighiaceae
Malpighiaceae genera